The following page lists all power stations in Netherlands.

Nuclear

Fossil

Wind

Megawatt electric (MWe)
It is the electric output of a power plant in megawatt. The electric output of a power plant is equal to the thermal overall power multiplied by the efficiency of the plant. The power plant efficiency of light water reactors amounts to 33 to 35% compared to up to 40% for modern coal-, oil- or gas-fired power plants.

See also 

 List of power stations in Europe
 List of largest power stations in the world

References

Netherlands
 
Lists of buildings and structures in the Netherlands